Bundi railway station (station code:- BUDI) is a railway station serving Bundi town, in Bundi district of Rajasthan State of India. It is under Kota railway division of West Central Railway Zone of Indian Railways. It is located on Kota–Chittorgarh line of the Indian Railways.

Administration
The station is under Kota railway division, which is a part of West Central Railway zone in Indian Railways.

Infrastructure

Location

References

External links

Railway stations in Bundi district
Kota railway division